Dylan Walker (born 27 September 1994) is a professional rugby league footballer who plays as a  and  for the New Zealand Warriors in the NRL, and has played for Australia and the New Zealand Maori at international level.

He previously played for the South Sydney Rabbitohs, with whom he won the 2014 NRL Premiership and the Manly-Warringah Sea Eagles. Walker has played at representative level for City Origin, NRL All Stars, New South Wales and the Prime Minister's XIII.

Following his arrest in December 2018 for the alleged assault of his fiancée, Walker was stood down by Manly and later the NRL. On 10 May 2019 the charges were dismissed and he was cleared to resume playing.

Background
Walker was born in Sydney, New South Wales, Australia.

Walker played his junior rugby league in the South Sydney Juniors competition for the Mascot Jets before being signed by the South Sydney Rabbitohs. Walker attended Matraville Sports High School. Walker played in the Rabbitohs NYC team in 2012-2013. In August 2012, Walker also played for the Australian Schoolboys.

Walker's mother is a Pitcairner and his father is Maori. He is a direct descendant of Fletcher Christian on his mother's side.

Playing career

2013
Walker finished his promising debut year in the NRL with him playing in 16 matches, scoring 8 tries and kicking 1 goal.

2014
On 14 February, Walker was named in Souths inaugural 2014 Auckland Nines squad. At the start of the 2014 NRL season, due to the new Souths appointed five-eighth Luke Keary getting injured in the Nines tournament and John Sutton being shifted to play in the forwards, Walker was appointed to be five-eighth. Walker played five-eighth in his junior years. He had his first start at five-eighth in round 1 against the Sydney Roosters where the South Sydney club won 28-8. Walker played at five-eighth till round 4 before being shifted back to his preferred position at centre and John Sutton filling in at five-eighth until Keary returned from injury.

In Round 9 against the Gold Coast Titans, Walker scored 4 tries in South Sydney's 40-18 win. On 14 October 2014, Walker was selected for the Australian Kangaroos 2014 Four Nations 24-man squad. Walker played in all of Australia's 4 matches, including playing at centre in the 22-18 loss in the final against New Zealand at Westpac Stadium.

2015
On 23 January 2015, Walker was named in the South Sydney Rabbitohs tournament winning 2015 NRL Auckland Nines squad. On 13 February, Walker played centre for NRL All Stars for the 2015 All Stars match at Cbus Super Stadium. Walker scored a try in the side's 20-6 loss to the Indigenous All Stars. In the 2015 NRL season Round 1 opener against the Brisbane Broncos at Suncorp Stadium, Walker scored the first try of the 2015 season in South Sydney's 36-6 win. On 13 June 2015, Walker was included into the New South Wales Blues origin squad as 19th man leading up to Game 2 of the 2015 State of Origin series. Walker finished the 2015 NRL season with him playing in 22 matches and scoring 13 tries for South Sydney. In the early hours of 22 September 2015, Walker and fellow South Sydney teammate and best friend Aaron Gray were hospitalized after the pair overdosed on prescription drugs Oxycodone and Tramadol. The pair were discovered by another friend of them who alerted emergency services and the pair were sent to St Vincent's Hospital in a critical condition placed in induced comas. The pair were released from hospital three days later to front the media about the unfortunate situation. Later on 26 November, Walker was released from the final year of his Rabbitohs contract after requesting a release, after finding out that he was fined five percent of his contract and the club angry at him for bringing the club into disrepute.

On 17 December 2015, Walker signed with the Manly Warringah Sea Eagles on a four-year deal starting from 2016, after he was heavily linked to sign with them since his release from the Rabbitohs, putting the end to his tumultuous off season. Although he has played most of his first-grade career in the centres, Walker has been touted by new Manly coach Trent Barrett and Manly-Warringah legend and rugby league Immortal Bob Fulton, themselves Australian former international five-eighths, as the replacement five-eighth for New Zealand international half Kieran Foran who has moved to play for Parramatta from 2016. At the official announcement of his signing during a Manly pre-season training camp in Coffs Harbour, Walker told the Sydney Morning Herald "Five-eighth was my favourite position coming through the juniors and if the coach (Barrett) wants me there I will jump at the opportunity".

2016
On 13 January, Walker was named in the emerging New South Wales Blues squad. In Round 1 of the 2016 NRL season, he made his club debut for Manly-Warringah against the Canterbury-Bankstown Bulldogs, starting at five-eighth in the Sea Eagles' 28-6 loss at Brookvale Oval. In Round 2 against the Wests Tigers, he scored his first club try for Manly in the 36-22 loss at Leichhardt Oval. On 1 June, he made his debut for New South Wales against Queensland in Game 1 of the 2016 State of Origin series, coming off the interchange bench. He came onto the field at the 71st minute, and made an error shortly after.

In July 2016, Walker was fined $10,000 by Manly-Warringah after he punched his front door and injured his hand.  Walker and his partner reported that he had punched the door out of frustration over an undisclosed incident.  Walker was ruled out for a month as his hand required surgery.

2017
For the 2017 season, Walker was shifted back to centre in the Manly side.  In round 8 against Canberra, Walker missed a conversion to win the game for Manly in normal time and got into an on-field incident with Canberra player Josh Hodgson.  In extra time, Walker kicked a penalty goal to win the game for Manly despite being heckled by the Canberra players behind the goal.  On 28 June 2017 against Cronulla, Cronulla player Jayden Brailey attempted to tackle Walker but broke his jaw in two places as a result, Walker was seen on camera abusing Brailey as he left the field.  At the end of the season, Walker was named Dally M Centre of the year.  On 28 September 2017 it was revealed Walker broke his leg and fractured his ankle while playing for The Australian prime ministers side.

2018
In Round 11 2018, Walker suffered a fractured eye socket after getting into a fist fight with Melbourne player Curtis Scott.  According to the other players on the field, Walker had been heckling Scott for most of the game when the fight broke out in the second half.  After the game scans revealed that Walker would be out for 6–8 weeks.

2019
In round 10 of the 2019 NRL season, Walker played his first game of the season and scored a try in his first game back since being stood down from the NRL.  Walker made a total of 17 appearances for Manly in 2019 as the club finished 6th on the table and qualified for the finals.  Walker played in both finals matches as the club reached the elimination semi-final against South Sydney in which Manly were defeated by his old club 34-26 at ANZ Stadium.

2020
Walker played a total of seven games for Manly-Warringah in the 2020 NRL season as they finished a disappointing 13th on the table.

2021
Walker played 20 games for Manly in the 2021 NRL season including the club's preliminary final loss against South Sydney.

2022
On 2 March, Walker signed a three-year deal to join the New Zealand Warriors starting in 2023.
Walker played a total of 19 games for Manly in the 2022 NRL season as the club finished 11th on the table.  Walker's final game for Manly was a 21-20 loss to Canterbury in round 25 of the competition.

Assault allegations
On 6 December 2018, Walker was arrested by police after allegedly assaulting his fiancée Alexandra Ivkovic that day at their home on Sydney's northern beaches. He was charged with domestic-related common assault and assault occasioning actual bodily harm.

The altercation was triggered by Ivanovo preparing dinner early and asking Walker whether he would prefer to use a fork or a spoon, while he wanted to continue playing his PlayStation. At a pre-trial court hearing on 26 February 2019 it was revealed that in two video statements and multiple written statements to police, Ivkovic had said that Walker pulled her to the ground by her ponytail, while she was holding their four month-old son in her arms, causing her to sustain several bloodied minor cuts. These statements were supported by the only witness, her neighbour. However, at the hearing, Ivkovic told the court that she believed Walker did not pull, but “touched my hair”, at which point she over-balanced and fell. The NRL applied its new no-fault stand down policy, so Walker was suspended indefinitely.

On 10 May 2019, at the court hearing, the magistrate dismissed the charges,
saying she was not satisfied beyond a reasonable doubt that Walker had assaulted his partner. The NRL stated immediately that its no fault stand down had expired and therefore Walker became free to resume playing for Manly.

In November 2020, it was reported that Walker was involved in an altercation with two men outside a pizza restaurant in Sydney's Northern Beaches.  Police were called to the scene and were told Walker left the restaurant and attempted to enter the vehicle of a woman, who was unknown to him, parked outside the restaurant.  Two restaurant workers then confronted Walker.  It is alleged Walker then became aggressive and assaulted the two men, including punching one in the face, before fleeing.  Walker was later arrested and taken to Manly police station.  On 18 November 2020, Walker pleaded not guilty to two counts of common assault.  Walker was then ordered to reappear back in court on 13 January 2021.

On 14 May 2021, Walker changed his plea to guilty but escaped conviction and was handed an 18-month conditional release after pleading guilty to one count of common assault relating to the pizza shop incident.

References

External links

Manly Sea Eagles profile
NRL profile
Manly Warringah Sea Eagles profile

1994 births
Living people
Australia national rugby league team players
Australian people of English descent
Australian people of Māori descent
Australian rugby league players
New Zealand Warriors players
Manly Warringah Sea Eagles players
New South Wales City Origin rugby league team players
New South Wales Rugby League State of Origin players
New Zealand Māori rugby league players
Ngāti Kahungunu people
North Sydney Bears NSW Cup players
NRL All Stars players
People educated at Matraville Sports High School
Rugby league centres
Rugby league five-eighths
Rugby league fullbacks
Rugby league players from Sydney
South Sydney Rabbitohs players